Art+Auction is a monthly art magazine published in New York City by Louise Blouin Media. It was started in 1979, and has a circulation of about 20,000 copies.

References

1979 establishments in New York City
Visual arts magazines published in the United States
Monthly magazines published in the United States
Contemporary art magazines
Magazines established in 1979
Magazines published in New York City
Visual arts publishing companies
Auction media